The New South Wales Minister for Homes is a minister in the New South Wales Government with responsibility for the administration and development of social housing and housing policy in New South Wales, Australia.

It was first established in 1919 as the Minister for Housing in the Nationalist ministry of William Holman, with the principal responsibility being the provision of housing for the poor. The ministerial title has had several incarnations from 1919 to 1921, 1922–1925, 1941–2011, 2017–2019, and 2019–2021. Between 2019 and 2021, the portfolio was absorbed by the new portfolio of Water, Property and Housing; however it was re-established in 2021 with its current title. Between 2015 and 2019, there was also a related Minister for Social Housing.

The current Minister for Homes is Anthony Roberts, since December 2021. Roberts also serves as the Minister for Planning, also with effect from December 2021. The minister administers the portfolio through the Planning and Environment cluster, including the Department of Planning and Environment and a range of other government agencies.

Ultimately the minister is responsible to the Parliament of New South Wales.

Role and responsibilities
A housing board was created in 1912, under the supervision of the Treasurer. A separate ministry was created in 1919 and its initial purpose was to regulate standards for housing construction and to provide housing for the poor. It was abolished with the first Dooley ministry in 1921 and was revived in the first and second Fuller ministries. Housing was re-established as a ministry in the first McKell Ministry as a part of the portfolio of Local Government and Housing. The minister oversaw the Housing Commission established by the Housing Act 1941, to provide housing for the unemployed and other schemes to assist the purchase and/or erection of homes for lower-income and servicemen's families. It became a separate ministry in the second McKell ministry and in addition to housing schemes for the poor the portfolio was responsible for a range of leasing and title bodies including rent control, landlord and tenant issues and strata title. In 2011 with the formation of the O'Farrell ministry housing was absorbed into the portfolio of Family and Community Services.

The separate portfolio of housing was briefly re-created in the First Berejiklian ministry in 2017, however it did not have responsibility for any legislation which remained with the portfolios of family and community services and social housing. The portfolio was abolished in the second Berejiklian ministry and housing became the responsibility of the Minister for Water, Property and Housing. The portfolio was re-established in 2021 in the Second Perrottet ministry as the Minister for Homes, in the Planning, Industry and Environment cluster.

List of ministers
The following individuals have served as Minister for Homes, or any precedent titles:

Social housing

References

Homes
New South Wales